Michael Sharples (born 14 December 1952 in Sale, England) is a British academic working in educational technology. He is an Emeritus Professor of Educational Technology at The Open University.

Background
Sharples graduated from St. Andrews University in 1976 with a BSc. Hons in Computational Science, then moved to the Dept of Artificial Intelligence at the University of Edinburgh as a post graduate student. His PhD thesis was on the topic of Cognition, Computers and Creative Writing.

Career
Sharples held various academic appointments before becoming director for the Centre for Educational Technology and Distance Learning at the University of Birmingham and later professor of learning sciences and Director of Learning Sciences Research Institute at the University of Nottingham.

Research
Sharples' research focus is on adapting and developing new technology and socio-technical systems to facilitate learning, such as the use of mobile devices.

Books
 Sharples, M. (1985) Cognition, Computers and Creative Writing, Chichester: Ellis Horwood. 
 Sharples, M., Hogg, D., Hutchison, C., Torrance, S., Young, D. (1989) Computers and Thought: a Practical Introduction to Artificial Intelligence. MIT Press. 406 pp. 
 Sharples, M. (ed.)(1993) Computer Supported Collaborative Writing. Springer-Verlag.
 Sharples, M. & van der Geest, T. (eds.)(1996) The New Writing Environment: Writers at Work in a World of Technology. Springer-Verlag. 
 Sharples, M. (1999) How We Write: Writing as Creative Design. London: Routledge.
 Littleton, K., Scanlon, E. & Sharples, M. (eds.)(2012) Orchestrating Inquiry Learning. Routledge. .

References

External links
 

Living people
People in educational technology
People from Sale, Greater Manchester
Alumni of the University of St Andrews
Academics of the Open University
1952 births